Randy Edward Smith (born March 3, 1960) is an American politician and a Republican member of the West Virginia Senate representing District 14 since January 11, 2017.

 In 2022, “Republican state Senator Randy Smith told voters that he planned to sponsor a bill proposing that those convicted of drug offenses voluntarily sterilize themselves to receive a reduced sentence. ‘If you want to lessen your prison sentence, if you're a man, you can get a vasectomy so you can't produce anymore,’Smith told audience members, according to the Cumberland Times-News. ‘If you're a woman, then you get your tubes tied, so you don't bring any more drug babies into the system.’”

Elections

2012 Smith was unopposed for the May 8, 2012 Republican Primary, winning with 1,485 votes, and won the November 6, 2012 General election, winning with 4,059 votes (57.6%) against Democratic incumbent Stan Shaver.

References

External links
Official page at the West Virginia Legislature
Campaign site

Randy Smith at Ballotpedia
Randy Smith at OpenSecrets

1960 births
Living people
Republican Party West Virginia state senators
Republican Party members of the West Virginia House of Delegates
People from Oakland, Maryland
People from Preston County, West Virginia
21st-century American politicians